Edward Hunter (7 March 1928 – August 2002) was a Scottish professional footballer who played as a wing half in the Football League.

References

1928 births
2002 deaths
People from Tillicoultry
Scottish footballers
Falkirk F.C. players
Accrington Stanley F.C. (1891) players
English Football League players
Scottish Football League players
Association football wing halves
Sportspeople from Clackmannanshire